Gunansar Papua Mandowen (born 14 November 2000) is an Indonesian professional footballer who plays as a winger or attacking midfielder for Liga 1 club PSM Makassar and the Indonesia national under-23 team.

Club career

Persipura Jayapura
In 2018, Gunansar joined Liga 1 club Persipura Jayapura. He made his debut on 24 March 2018 in a match against Persela Lamongan. On 7 April 2018, Gunansar scored his first goal for Persipura in the 28th minute against PS TIRA at the Mandala Stadium, Jayapura.

PSM Makassar
On 29 January 2023, Mandowen signed a contract with Liga 1 club PSM Makassar from Persipura Jayapura. Mandowen made his league debut for the club in a 0–1 win against Arema, coming on as a substituted Kenzo Nambu.

International career
In October 2021, Mandowen was called up to the Indonesia U23 in a friendly match against Tajikistan and Nepal and also prepared for 2022 AFC U-23 Asian Cup qualification in Tajikistan by Shin Tae-yong. Mandowen made his debut for Indonesia U23, on 19 October 2021, by starting in a 2–1 win against Tajikistan U23.

Career statistics

Club

References

External links
 Gunansar Mandowen at Soccerway
 Gunansar Mandowen at Liga Indonesia

2000 births
Living people
Indonesian footballers
People from Sarmi Regency
Association football midfielders
Liga 1 (Indonesia) players
Persipura Jayapura players
Indonesia youth international footballers
Sportspeople from Papua